Morsárfoss is a waterfall in Vatnajökull National Park, Iceland. Measurements showed that one of them was at least 240 meters in total height, making it the highest waterfall in Iceland. Morsárfoss became visible in 2007 when Morsárjökull, an outlet glacier of Vatnajökull glacier, started melting.

References

External links 

Waterfalls of Iceland